Barossa Valley Way is the main road linking most of the major towns of the Barossa Valley in South Australia, designated as route B19 for its entire length. It is 35 km long, roughly following the North Para River.

Route
Barossa Valley Way starts in the centre of Gawler and heads east, passing through Sandy Creek, Lyndoch, Rowland Flat, Tanunda and Nuriootpa, where it crosses the North Para River and meets Sturt Highway. The route is predominantly on the valley floor, with wineries and vineyards on both sides of the road, with views of the rising ground including the Barossa Ranges.

History
Barossa Valley Way follows a previous alignment of the Sturt Highway, which used to pass through the towns of Gawler, Lyndoch, Tanunda and Nuriootpa instead of where it now passes around the west and north of Gawler and the Barossa Valley.

Major intersections

See also

 Highways in Australia
 List of highways in South Australia
 Barossa Valley (wine)

References

Highways in South Australia
Barossa Valley